The 2017 Houston Astros season was the team's 56th season for the Major League Baseball (MLB) franchise in Houston, Texas, their 53rd as the Astros, fifth in both the American League (AL) and AL West division, and 18th at Minute Maid Park. 
The Astros won the World Series in seven games over the Los Angeles Dodgers for the first World Series championship in franchise history.

On September 17, the Astros clinched the AL West with a 7–1 victory over the Mariners, for their first AL West division title, and their seventh division title overall.  The Astros defeated Boston 3–2 on September 29 for their 100th win of the season, their first 100-win season since 1998.  Overall, the Astros finished with a 101–61 regular season record, their second-highest win total in franchise history, for a .623 winning percentage.
Just four days after the end of the regular season, the Astros met the Red Sox at home in the AL Division Series (ALDS), and defeated them in four games.  Houston then advanced to the AL Championship Series (ALCS) and defeated the New York Yankees in seven games for their first American League pennant.  Combined with their NL pennant in 2005, the Astros became the first MLB team to make it to the World Series as members of both the National and American Leagues.  Finally, the Astros faced and defeated the Los Angeles Dodgers in the 2017 World Series 4 games to 3.

The 2017 Astros featured the highest-scoring offense in the major leagues (896 runs scored), including the highest batting average (.282), on-base percentage (.346), and slugging percentage (.478).  The offense was led by AL batting champion and second baseman José Altuve (.346) who won a number of distinctions, including Most Valuable Player (AL MVP), Sports Illustrated Sportsperson of the Year, and Associated Press Male Athlete of the Year.  He became just the second Astro to win the MVP following Jeff Bagwell in 1994.  The ALCS MVP was starting pitcher Justin Verlander, and the World Series MVP was center fielder George Springer.

Because of its record-setting numbers and individual accolades, this Astros batting lineup is often cited as one of the highest-performing in history.

Manager A. J. Hinch led the on-field team, and general manager Jeff Luhnow presided over the baseball operations department.  The Astros sent six players to the 88th All-Star Game held at Marlins Park in Miami, including Altuve, Springer, shortstop Carlos Correa, and pitchers Dallas Keuchel, Lance McCullers Jr., and Chris Devenski.  Bagwell, a first baseman who spent his entire 15-year major league career in an Astros uniform, was inducted into the Baseball Hall of Fame on July 30, 2017.

This season also marked their 53rd as the Astros (the team was the Colt .45s until 1965), their fifth in the American League, and their 18th at Minute Maid Park. The season was later marred by a sign stealing scandal.

Offseason

November 2016 
Source

December  
Source

January 2017 
Source

February 
Source

March 
Source

April 
Source

Regular season

Summary

April−June

The Astros began the regular season at home versus the Seattle Mariners on April 3, 2017.

One of the most memorable and debated manifestations to hallmark the 2017 season was José Altuve's height and style of play contrasts with that of New York Yankees right fielder Aaron Judge. In July, a photo emerged of the pair standing side by side in game versus the Yankees that displayed their drastic size difference and became a viral phenomenon.

Two Astros pitchers were awarded the AL Pitcher of the Month Award in the first two months of the season.  In April, left-handed starting pitcher Dallas Keuchel posted a 5–0 win–loss record (W–L), allowing six runs in six games started and 1.21 earned run average (ERA) over  innings pitched (IP).  It was his fourth career monthly award, making him the first Astros pitcher to win four; J. R. Richard was the other Astros pitcher who had won three.  Keuchel joined Bartolo Colón, Félix Hernández, Justin Verlander as active pitchers who had won at least four.

From May 6−23, starting pitcher Lance McCullers Jr. completed 22 scoreless innings, which among Astros pitchers, was the longest scoreless inning streak since Roy Oswalt delivered 32 from August 27 through September 11, 2008.  In that same span, McCullers also became the first Astros pitcher since Nolan Ryan in 1984 to allow no earned runs over at least five innings pitched in each of four consecutive appearances.

During the May 14 game versus New York at Yankee Stadium, third baseman Alex Bregman hit his first major league grand slam off Masahiro Tanaka in a 10–7 Astros win.  On May 20, Keuchel was placed on the 10-day disabled list due to a pinched nerve in his neck.

Shortstop Carlos Correa delivered a career-best five consecutive multiple-hit games from May 25−29, and totaled 14 such games on the month.  In May, he was selected for his first AL Player of the Month Award, and McCullers his first AL Pitcher of the Month Award.  In 26 games, Correa batted .386, eight doubles, seven home runs, 26 RBI and a 1.130 OPS.  His batting average and RBI total led the AL, on-base percentage ranked third, hits and OPS fifth, and slugging tied for sixth.

McCullers was credited with a 4−0 record in six starts during the month of May.  He permitted an AL-leading 0.99 earned run average (ERA), 21 hits, and a .164 batting average against (BAA) with 37 strikeouts.  He also ranked second in wins, third in BAA, and tied for fifth in strikeouts.

With persistent neck problems, the Astros placed Keuchel back on the disabled list on June 8.

July
In the July 9 game versus the Toronto Blue Jays, the Astros won 19–1 as Correa homered twice, collected four hits, and drove in a career-best five runs.  He reached the 20-home run mark and saw a 15-game hitting streak snapped the previous day.  It was the Astros' 60th win of the season, making them the fifth team within the previous 40 years to reach that many wins before the All-Star break.  The Astros entered the All-Star break with the best record in the AL, at 60–29, marking the best 89-game start in franchise history.  Their -game lead in the AL West marked the largest divisional lead the club had ever attained all-time.

For the first time in franchise history, three Astros players were elected by fans as starters for the All-Star Game, held at Marlins Park in Miami.  The starters were Altuve, Correa, and center fielder George Springer.  As was former Astros manager Brad Mills' selection, Altuve, who typically hit third for the Astros, batted leadoff for the American League.  Springer, the Astros leadoff hitter, batted cleanup.  Two others Astros made the team, including Keuchel and McCullers.

On July 18, Correa sustained a torn ligament in the left thumb, and the Astros placed him on the DL.

Rookie third baseman Colin Moran sustained fractures of the facial bones during a game versus the Baltimore Orioles on July 22.  The injury occurred as he fouled off a pitch, and the batted ball struck him directly in the face.  He underwent surgery to repair the fractures on July 31.

On July 30, 2017, former Astros first baseman Jeff Bagwell was inducted into the Baseball Hall of Fame in Cooperstown, New York.

In July, Altuve batted .485 for the fifth-highest average in one month since 1961.  Over 23 games, he accumulated 48 hits, 10 doubles, one triple, four home runs, 21 RBI and 1.251 OPS.  He carried a 19-game hitting streak from July 2–23.  He also recorded five consecutive multi-hit games during the week of July 3–9, becoming the ninth player in MLB history to do so.  His average set the Astros record for one calendar month—surpassing Richard Hidalgo's .476 average in September of 2000—and he won his second AL Player of the Month Award.  Yuli Gurriel won the AL Rookie of the Month Award in July, and he led all AL rookies with .565 slugging percentage, .899 OPS, 28 hits, nine doubles, and 20 RBI.  The nine doubles tied Lance Berkman's club record for rookies in a single month.

August
On August 10, Bregman tied the Astros' record for extra-base hits in consecutive games at 10 games, first accomplished by Hidalgo.  In a 27-game stretch following the All-Star break, the Astros slumped, going 11–16.

On August 13, 2017, the Chicago White Sox traded reliever Tyler Clippard to the Astros for a player to be named later or cash considerations.

On Saturday, August 26, Hurricane Harvey reached Houston.  The Astros were playing a series versus the Los Angeles Angels at the time, and were scheduled to return home to host the Texas Rangers.  The games versus the Rangers were relocated to Tropicana Field in St. Petersburg, Florida, as more than 50 inches of rain inundated parts of Greater Houston and flooded more than one-third.  Team officials planned for the next series versus the New York Mets also to be played at Tropicana Field, but mayor Sylvester Turner encouraged Astros president Reid Ryan to return the team to Houston to play the Mets.  "You guys come home and play baseball," said Turner to Ryan. "This will be the beginning of our rebuild."

In the aftermath of Hurricane Harvey, the Astros assisted in the rebuild of various parts of the city during their off-time.  One establishment included the Houston chapter of the Boys & Girls Clubs of America.  Individual members of the team delivered meals, cleaned up damaged homes, and rescued pets.  They visited the George R. Brown Convention Center, which housed more than 7,000 people displaced from their homes.

Having lost 17 of 27 games as of August 31, the Astros acquired right-handed ace and former Cy Young Award winner Justin Verlander from the Detroit Tigers just moments before the trade deadline.  Detroit received prospects Franklin Pérez, Jake Rogers, and Daz Cameron.  The Astros also claimed outfielder Cameron Maybin off waivers from the Angels on August 31.  Correa and McCullers returned from the disabled list at that time.  Verlander won all five regular season starts in an Astros uniform to help lead them to a 22–8 record over their final month and an overall registry of 101–61, clinching the AL West division title.

September/October
Verlander's debut as an Astro occurred on September 5 in a 3–1 victory versus the Mariners.  The only run he allowed was a home run to Kyle Seager and he struck out seven over six innings.  Maybin homered in the seventh inning to break a 1–1 tie, giving the Astros their sixth consecutive win.

Moran returned to the Astros on September 19, having completed a rehabilitation assignment at Class-A Quad Cities River Bandits.  He had sustained a fracture below the left eye in a game on July 22.

On September 19, Altuve was announced as the recipient of MLB's Lou Gehrig Memorial Award for 2017, as the player "who best exemplifies the giving character" of Gehrig.

In the last series of the regular season, the Astros defeated the Red Sox 3–2 on September 29 for their 100th win of the season.  Charlie Morton (14–7) pitched six innings to earn the win and Bregman hit a tie-breaking home run.  The Astros joined the Los Angeles Dodgers and Cleveland Indians as 100-game winners in 2017, marking the first time since 2003 that three or more teams reached the milestone, and the sixth time overall in major league history.  It was Houston's first 100-win season since 1998, when they won a club-record 102 games.  The Astros defeated the Boston Red Sox on the last day of the regular season, Sunday, Oct. 1, 2017, to finish the season with a record of 101–61.

Having achieve 200 hits on the season, Altuve became just the fifth hitter since integration in 1947 to record four straight 200-hit seasons, following Wade Boggs (1983−89), Kirby Puckett (1986−89), Ichiro Suzuki (2001−2010), and Michael Young (2003−07). He also became the first hitter in Major League history to solely lead his respective league in hits for four years in a row while also collecting his third career batting title.  Suzuki technically led the AL in hits from 2006 to 2010, but tied with Dustin Pedroia in 2008.

Season standings

American League West

American League Division Leaders

Record against opponents

Postseason

As winners of their respective division, the Astros received a bye during the procession of the AL Wild Card Game, played between the wild card winners, New York Yankees and Minnesota Twins.  The Astros were seeded #2 in the AL, the result of attaining the second-most wins in the league.  Their first playoff game of 2017 was in the American League Division Series, versus the Boston Red Sox.  It was the first time the Astros had faced the Red Sox in the postseason.

American League Division Series (ALDS)

The Astros played American League East division champion Boston Red Sox in the ALDS.  In Game 1, Altuve hit three home runs in a single game for the first time of his career while becoming the tenth player to hit three home runs in a single postseason game.  Verlander won two games in the Astros' 3-games-to-1 triumph over the Red Sox. He started and won Game 1, and picked up the second win with  innings of relief in the clinching Game 4.

American League Championship Series (ALCS)

The Astros faced the wild-card game winning Yankees in the ALCS.  The Astros selected Keuchel to start Game 1 versus the Yankees' Masahiro Tanaka.  In a pitcher's duel, Tanaka allowed no runs through the first three innings before the Astros scored in the bottom of the fourth.  Altuve hit an infield single and stole second base before Carlos Correa drove him in with an RBI single. Yuli Gurriel drove in Correa to give the Astros a 2–0 lead. Keuchel recorded ten strikeouts, allowing four hits and no runs in seven innings. Tanaka pitched six innings with three strikeouts and allowed two earned runs.  The Yankees scored their only run of the game in the ninth, when closer Ken Giles allowed a solo home run to Greg Bird before striking out Jacoby Ellsbury swinging to end the game.  Giles struck out four of six batters faced for his first save of the ALCS and second of the postseason.

On October 14, Verlander started Game 2, throwing a 13-strikeout, 2–1 complete game victory.  The Astros won the game on a ninth-inning walk-off double by Carlos Correa that drove home Altuve.  Facing elimination in Game 6 of the ALCS, Verlander pitched seven shutout innings in a 7−1 victory over the Yankees.

The Astros also defeated the Yankees 4−0 in Game 7, on October 21, 2017, allowing them to advance to the World Series for the second time in franchise history, and first as a member of the American League.  McCullers pitched four scoreless innings in relief to earn his first career save.

Verlander's totals in the ALCS included a 2−0 W−L, 0.56 ERA and 21 strikeouts in 16 innings pitched.  As a result, he was named the ALCS Most Valuable Player (MVP).

World Series

In Game 2, Springer, Correa, Altuve—and two Dodgers players–Charlie Culberson and Yasiel Puig—all homered in extra innings as the Astros prevailed, 7−6.  The five home runs accounted for the most hit in extra innings of any single game in major league history.

In Game 3, Yu Darvish started for the Dodgers against Lance McCullers Jr. for the Astros.  The Astros scored four runs in the bottom of the second inning on a home run by Yuli Gurriel and RBIs by González, Brian McCann, and Alex Bregman.  Darvish left the game after  innings, which is the shortest outing of his career (he would tie that feat in Game 7, that time giving up five runs).  In the top of the third, McCullers loaded the bases with three consecutive walks. The Dodgers managed to score one run when Corey Seager grounded into a double play. The Astros added another run in the fifth on an RBI single by Evan Gattis and the Dodgers added two in the sixth on an RBI groundout by Puig and a wild pitch. McCullers wound up pitching 5 innings and allowed three runs on four hits. Brad Peacock replaced McCullers, completing the final  innings with no hits allowed and four strikeouts to earn his first major league save.  It was the longest hitless World Series relief outing since Ron Taylor's four innings in Game 4 of the 1964 Series, and tied Ken Clay for the longest hitless postseason save, first accomplished in the 1978 ALCS.

Game 5 featured a "roller coaster" of momentum changes induced by key home runs. The Astros fell behind by scores of 4–0, 7–4, and 8–7, but hit a game-tying home run to reduce each deficit.  They eventually led 12–9 in the ninth inning, but the Dodgers made their own comeback to tie the game at 12 with a home run from Puig and an RBI single from Chris Taylor.  In the bottom of the 10th, Alex Bregman singled to left field off Dodgers closer Kenley Jansen to score pinch runner Derek Fisher for the walk-off hit.  That single concluded the second-longest game in World Series history, running at five hours, 17 minutes.  Doug Miller of MLB.com ranked World Series Game 5 as the top game of 2017.

Springer homered and doubled in Game 7, finishing with two runs and two RBI.  He hit five home runs, tying the World Series record shared by Reggie Jackson and Dodgers second baseman Chase Utley.  He also homered in each of the final four games, setting a World Series record for consecutive games with a home run.  Springer was named the World Series Most Valuable Player (MVP), hitting 11 of 29 at bats and driving in seven as the Astros' leadoff hitter.

As a side note, Springer was featured on a 2014 cover of Sports Illustrated magazine that heralded a World Series win for the Astros in 2017.

Altuve and Verlander were named co-winners of the Babe Ruth Award as MVPs of the Astros' postseason.  In the Astros' 18-game championship run, Altuve batted .310/.388/.634, 22 hits, 14 runs scored, seven home runs, 14 RBI, and nine extra-base hits.  He established a franchise record for total hits in a postseason.  Further, he tied the record for home runs by a second baseman in a single postseason, and hit the fourth-most among all players.  Verlander made six appearances and five starts, being credited with a 4–1 record, and gaining a 2.21 ERA, .177 batting average against, eight walks, and 38 strikeouts in  innings.

Weeks after the end of the World Series, an unidentified Astros player revealed that Darvish was tipping his pitches.  He cycled through  IP in two World Series starts and allowed a 21.60 ERA, while striking out no Houston batters.  He was much more successful in the NLDS and NLCS, allowing two earned runs over  IP with 14 strikeouts.

Altuve, along with Houston Texans defensive end J. J. Watt, were named co-winners of the Sports Illustrated Sportsperson of the Year Award for his efforts in leading the Astros to their first World Series title and aiding in the recovery of the Greater Houston area in the aftermath of Hurricane Harvey.

Following the conclusion of the World Series, Beltrán announced his retirement from his professional baseball.

Postseason rosters

| style="text-align:left" | 
Pitchers: 35 Justin Verlander 36 Will Harris 41 Brad Peacock 43 Lance McCullers Jr. 44 Luke Gregerson 46 Francisco Liriano 47 Chris Devenski 50 Charlie Morton 53 Ken Giles 59 Joe Musgrove 60 Dallas Keuchel
Catchers: 16 Brian McCann 30 Juan Centeno 
Infielders: 1 Carlos Correa 2 Alex Bregman 10 Yuli Gurriel 13 Tyler White 27 José Altuve 
Outfielders: 3 Cameron Maybin 4 George Springer 9 Marwin González 21 Derek Fisher 22 Josh Reddick
Designated hitters: 11 Evan Gattis 15 Carlos Beltrán 
|- valign="top"
 

| style="text-align:left" | 
Pitchers: 31 Collin McHugh 35 Justin Verlander 36 Will Harris 41 Brad Peacock 43 Lance McCullers Jr. 44 Luke Gregerson 46 Francisco Liriano 47 Chris Devenski 50 Charlie Morton 53 Ken Giles 59 Joe Musgrove 60 Dallas Keuchel
Catchers: 16 Brian McCann 30 Juan Centeno
Infielders: 1 Carlos Correa 2 Alex Bregman 10 Yuli Gurriel 27 José Altuve
Outfielders: 3 Cameron Maybin 4 George Springer 9 Marwin González 21 Derek Fisher 22 Josh Reddick
Designated hitters: 11 Evan Gattis 15 Carlos Beltrán
|- valign="top"
 

| style="text-align:left" |
Pitchers: 31 Collin McHugh 35 Justin Verlander 36 Will Harris 41 Brad Peacock 43 Lance McCullers Jr. 44 Luke Gregerson 46 Francisco Liriano 47 Chris Devenski 50 Charlie Morton 53 Ken Giles 59 Joe Musgrove 60 Dallas Keuchel
Catchers: 16 Brian McCann 30 Juan Centeno
Infielders: 1 Carlos Correa 2 Alex Bregman 10 Yuli Gurriel 27 José Altuve
Outfielders: 3 Cameron Maybin 4 George Springer 9 Marwin González 21 Derek Fisher 22 Josh Reddick
Designated hitters: 11 Evan Gattis 15 Carlos Beltrán
|- valign="top"

Game log

Regular season

|- style="text-align:center; background:#cfc;"
| 1 || April 3 || Mariners || 3–0 || Keuchel (1–0) || Hernández (0–1) || Giles (1) || 41,678 || 1–0 || W1 
|- style="text-align:center; background:#cfc;"
| 2 || April 4 || Mariners || 2–1 || McCullers (1–0) || Iwakuma (0–1) || Giles (2) || 21,406 || 2–0 || W2 
|- style="text-align:center; background:#cfc;"
| 3 || April 5 || Mariners || 5–3 (13) || Peacock (1–0) || De Jong (0–1) || — || 20,303 || 3–0 || W3
|- style="text-align:center; background:#fbb;"
| 4 || April 6 || Mariners || 2–4 || Altavilla (1–0) || Giles (0–1) || Diaz (1) || 18,362 || 3–1 || L1 
|- style="text-align:center; background:#fbb;"
| 5 || April 7 || Royals || 1–5 || Vargas (1–0) || Fiers (0–1) || — || 30,491 || 3–2 || L2 
|- style="text-align:center; background:#fbb;"
| 6 || April 8 || Royals || 3–7 || Duffy (1–0) || Gregerson (0–1) || — || 35,373 || 3–3 || L3
|- style="text-align:center; background:#cfc;"
| 7 || April 9 || Royals || 5–4 (12) || Devenski (1–0) || Strahm (0–2) || — || 32,411 || 4–3 || W1 
|- style="text-align:center; background:#fbb;"
| 8 || April 10 || @ Mariners || 0–6 || Paxton (1–0) || Morton (0–1) || — || 44,856 || 4–4 || L1
|- style="text-align:center; background:#cfc;"
| 9 || April 11 || @ Mariners || 7–5 || Musgrove (1–0) || Miranda (0–1) || — || 18,527 || 5–4 || W1
|- style="text-align:center; background:#cfc;"
| 10 || April 12 || @ Mariners || 10–5 || Peacock (2–0) || Altavilla (1–1) || — || 14,479 || 6–4 || W2
|- style="text-align:center; background:#cfc;"
| 11 || April 14 || @ Athletics || 7–2 || Keuchel (2–0) || Madson (0–1) || — || 15,385 || 7–4 || W3 
|- style="text-align:center; background:#cfc;"
| 12 || April 15 || @ Athletics || 10–6 ||Harris  (1-0) || Casilla (0-1) || || 20,140 || 8–4 || W4
|- style="text-align:center; background:#ccc;"
| — || April 16 || @ Athletics || colspan="8" | Postponed (rain). Makeup date: September 9.
|- style="text-align:center; background:#cfc;"
| 13 || April 17 || Angels || 3–0 || Morton (1–1) || Chavez (1–2) || Giles (3) || 23,501 || 9–4 || W5 
|- style="text-align:center; background:#fbb;"
| 14 || April 18 || Angels || 2–5 || Nolasco (1–2)|| Musgrove (1–1)  || Bedrosian (3)  || 21,760 || 9–5 || L1
|- style="text-align:center; background:#cfc;"
| 15 || April 19 || Angels || 5–1 || Kechuel (3–0) || Ramírez (2–2) || — || 24,028 ||10–5 || W1
|- style="text-align:center; background:#cfc;"
| 16 || April 20 || Angels || 2–1 || McCullers (2–0) || Shoemaker (0–1) || Devenski (1) || 23,173 || 11–5 || W2
|- style="text-align:center; background:#cfc;"
| 17 || April 21 || @ Rays || 6–3 || Feliz (1-0) || Cobb (1-2) || Giles (4) || 17,683 || 12–5 || W3
|- style="text-align:center; background:#fbb;"
| 18 || April 22 || @ Rays || 3–6 || Pruitt (2–0) || Morton (1–2) || Colomé (4) || 17,008 || 12–6 || L1 
|- style="text-align:center; background:#cfc;"
| 19 || April 23 || @ Rays || 6–4 (10) || Gregerson (1–1) || Garton (0–1) || Giles (5) || 15,548 || 13–6 || W1 
|- style="text-align:center; background:#cfc;"
| 20 || April 25 || @ Indians || 4–2 || Keuchel (4–0) || Tomlin (1–3) || — || 14,581 || 14–6 || W2
|- style="text-align:center; background:#fbb;"
| 21 || April 26 || @ Indians || 6–7 || Bauer (2–2) || McCullers (2–1) || Allen (4) || 16,052 || 14–7 || L1 
|- style="text-align:center; background:#fbb;"
| 22 || April 27 || @ Indians || 3–4 || Kluber (3–1) || Devenski (1–1) || Allen (5) || 14,452 || 14–8 || L2
|- style="text-align:center; background:#cfc;"
| 23 || April 28 || Athletics || 9–4 || Morton (2–2) || Cotton (2–3) || — || 28,472 || 15–8 || W1
|- style="text-align:center; background:#fbb;"
| 24 || April 29 || Athletics || 1–2 || Triggs (4–1) || Musgrove (1–2) || Casilla (4) || 32,147 || 15–9 || L1 
|- style="text-align:center; background:#cfc;"
| 25 || April 30 || Athletics || 7–2 || Keuchel (5–0) || Hahn (1–2) || Giles (6) || 34,880 || 16–9 || W1 
|-

|- style="text-align:center; background:#cfc;"
| 26 || May 1 || Rangers || 6–2 || Devenski (2–1) || Cashner (0–3) || Giles (7) || 22,556 || 17–9 || W2 
|- style="text-align:center; background:#cfc;"
| 27 || May 2 || Rangers || 8–7 || Hoyt (1–0) || Kela (0–1) || Harris (1) || 26,208 || 18–9 || W3
|- style="text-align:center; background:#cfc;"
| 28 || May 3 || Rangers || 10–1 || Morton (3–2) || Martinez (0–1) || — || 27,439 || 19–9 || W4
|- style="text-align:center; background:#fbb;"
| 29 || May 4 || Rangers || 4–10 || Griffin (3–0) || Musgrove (1–3) || — || 27,391 || 19–10 || L1
|- style="text-align:center; background:#cfc;"
| 30 || May 5 || @ Angels || 7–6 (10) || Giles (1–1) || Norris (0–1) || Devenski (2) || 34,556 || 20–10 || W1 
|- style="text-align:center; background:#fbb;"
| 31 || May 6 || @ Angels || 1–2 || Norris (1–1) || Devenski (2–2) || — || 41,097 || 20–11 || L1
|- style="text-align:center; background:#cfc;"
| 32 || May 7 || @ Angels || 5–3 || Fiers (1–1) || Shoemaker (1–2) || Giles (8) || 38,383 || 21–11 || W1
|- style="text-align:center; background:#cfc;"
| 33 || May 9 || Braves || 8–3 || Morton (4–2) || Colón (1–4) || — || 28,724 || 22–11 || W2
|- style="text-align:center; background:#cfc;"
| 34 || May 10 || Braves || 4–2 || Musgrove (2–3) || García (1–2) || Giles (9) || 23,676 || 23–11 || W3
|- style="text-align:center; background:#cfc;"
| 35 || May 11 || @ Yankees || 3–2 || Keuchel (6–0) || Pineda (3–2) || Giles (10) || 39,050 || 24–11 || W4
|- style="text-align:center; background:#cfc;"
| 36 || May 12 || @ Yankees || 5–1 || McCullers (3–1) || Montgomery (2–2)  || — || 41,150 || 25–11 || W5
|- style="text-align:center; background:#ccc;"
| — || May 13 || @ Yankees || colspan="7" |Postponed (inclement weather). Makeup date: May 14. 
|- style="text-align:center; background:#fbb;"
| 37 || May 14 (1) || @ Yankees || 6–11 || Warren (1–0) || Harris (1–1) || — || 47,883 || 25–12 || L1
|- style="text-align:center; background:#cfc;"
| 38 || May 14 (2) || @ Yankees || 10–7 || Morton (5–2) || Tanaka (5–2) || — || 47,883 || 26–12 || W1
|- style="text-align:center; background:#cfc;"
| 39 || May 15 || @ Marlins || 7–2 || Musgrove (3–3) || Tazawa (1–1) || — || 16,448 || 27–12 || W2
|- style="text-align:center; background:#cfc;"
| 40 || May 16 || @ Marlins || 12–2 || Keuchel (7–0) || Koehler (1–2) || — || 18,056 || 28–12 || W3
|- style="text-align:center; background:#cfc;"
| 41 || May 17 || @ Marlins || 3–0 || McCullers (4–1) || Ureña (1–2) || Giles (11) || 24,699 || 29–12 || W4
|- style="text-align:center; background:#fbb;"
| 42 || May 19 || Indians || 3–5 || Bauer (4–4) || Morton (5–3) || Allen (11) || 36,446 || 29–13 || L1
|- style="text-align:center; background:#fbb;"
| 43 || May 20 || Indians || 0–3 || Clevinger (2–1) || Fiers (1–2) || Allen (12) || 34,698 || 29–14 || L2
|- style="text-align:center; background:#fbb;"
| 44 || May 21 || Indians || 6–8 || Salazar (3–4) || Musgrove (3–4) || — || 33,476 || 29–15 || L3
|- style="text-align:center; background:#cfc;"
| 45 || May 22 || Tigers || 1–0 || Devenski (3–2) || Fulmer (5–2) || Giles (12) || 22,146 || 30–15 || W1
|- style="text-align:center; background:#cfc;"
| 46 || May 23 || Tigers || 6–2 || McCullers (5–1) || Zimmermann (4–3) || — || 23,179 || 31–15 || W2
|- style="text-align:center; background:#fbb;"
| 47 || May 24 || Tigers || 3–6 || Greene (1–0) || Devenski (3–3) || — || 26,481 || 31–16 || L1
|- style="text-align:center; background:#cfc;"
| 48 || May 25 || Tigers || 7–6 || Gregerson (2–1) || Wilson (1–2) || Giles (13) || 25,046 || 32–16 || W1
|- style="text-align:center; background:#cfc;"
| 49 || May 26 || Orioles || 2–0 || Musgrove (4–4) || Gausman (2–4) || Giles (14) || 31,380 || 33–16 || W2
|- style="text-align:center; background:#cfc;"
| 50 || May 27 || Orioles || 5–2 || Keuchel (8–0) || Miley (1–3) || Harris (2) || 32,761 || 34–16 || W3
|- style="text-align:center; background:#cfc;"
| 51 || May 28 || Orioles || 8–4 || McCullers (6–1) || Asher (1–3) || — || 34,720 || 35–16 || W4
|- style="text-align:center; background:#cfc;"
| 52 || May 29 || @ Twins || 16–8 ||Jankowski (1–0)  || Breslow (1–1)  || — || 24,272 || 36–16 || W5
|- style="text-align:center; background:#cfc;"
| 53 || May 30 || @ Twins || 7–2 || Fiers (2–2) || Berríos (3–1) || — || 22,616 || 37–16 || W6
|- style="text-align:center; background:#cfc;"
| 54 || May 31 || @ Twins || 17–6 || Feliz (2–0) || Santiago (4–5) || — || 25,593 || 38–16 || W7
|-

|- style="text-align:center; background:#cfc;"
| 55 || June 2 || @ Rangers || 7–1 || Keuchel (9–0) || Darvish (5–4) || — || 39,729 || 39–16 || W8
|- style="text-align:center; background:#cfc;"
| 56 || June 3 || @ Rangers || 6–5 || Devenski (4–3) || Cashner (2–5) || Giles (15) || 44,168 || 40–16 || W9
|- style="text-align:center; background:#cfc;"
| 57 || June 4 || @ Rangers || 7–2 || Peacock (3–0) || Pérez (2–6) || — || 39,204 || 41–16 || W10
|- style="text-align:center; background:#cfc;"
| 58 || June 5 || @ Royals || 7–3 || Fiers (3–2) || Kennedy (0–6) || — || 21,892 || 42–16 || W11
|- style="text-align:center; background:#fbb;"
| 59 || June 6 || @ Royals || 7–9 || Minor (3–1) || Giles (1–2) || — || 20,974 || 42–17 || L1 
|- style="text-align:center; background:#fbb;"
| 60 || June 7 || @ Royals || 5–7 || Vargas (8–3) || Díaz (0–1) || Herrera (13) || 25,628 || 42–18 || L2
|- style="text-align:center; background:#cfc;"
| 61 || June 8 || @ Royals || 6–1 || Harris (2–1) || Herrera (1–2) || — || 32,747 || 43–18 || W1 
|- style="text-align:center; background:#fbb;"
| 62 || June 9 || Angels || 4–9 || Shoemaker (6–3) || Peacock (3–1) || — || 40,786 || 43–19 || L1 
|- style="text-align:center; background:#cfc;"
| 63 || June 10 || Angels || 3–1 || Fiers (4–2) || Nolasco (2–7) || Giles (16) || 41,296 || 44–19 || W1
|- style="text-align:center; background:#fbb;"
| 64 || June 11 || Angels || 6–12 || Middleton (1–0) || Feliz (2–1) || — || 32,425 || 44–20 || L1 
|- style="text-align:center; background:#fbb;"
| 65 || June 12 || Rangers || 1–6 || Darvish (6–4) || Musgrove (4–5) || — || 25,698 ||44–21 || L2
|- style="text-align:center; background:#fbb;"
| 66 || June 13 || Rangers || 2–4 || Leclerc (1–1) || Gregerson (2–2) || Bush (8) || 27,615 || 44–22 || L3 
|- style="text-align:center; background:#cfc;"
| 67 || June 14 || Rangers || 13–2 || Martes (1–0) || Cashner (3–6) || — || 37,221 || 45–22 || W1
|- style="text-align:center; background:#fbb;"
| 68 || June 16 || Red Sox || 1–2 || Kelly (3–0) || Harris (2–2) || Kimbrel (19) || 36,189 || 45–23 || L1 
|- style="text-align:center; background:#cfc;"
| 69 || June 17 || Red Sox || 7–1 || Paulino (1–0) || Porcello (3–9) || — || 41,017 || 46–23 || W1
|- style="text-align:center; background:#fbb;"
| 70 || June 18 || Red Sox || 5–6 || Price (2–1) || Musgrove (4–6) || Kimbrel (20) || 38,389 || 46–24 || L1 
|- style="text-align:center; background:#cfc;"
| 71 || June 19 || @ Athletics || 4–1 || Peacock (4–1) || Gossett (0–2) || Giles (17) || 10,482 || 47–24 || W1 
|- style="text-align:center; background:#cfc;"
| 72 || June 20 || @ Athletics || 8–4 || Martes (2–0) || Gray (2–3) || — || 15,362 || 48–24 || W2
|- style="text-align:center; background:#cfc;"
| 73 || June 21 || @ Athletics || 5–1 || Fiers (5–2) || Manaea (6–4) || — || 12,277 || 49–24 || W3
|- style="text-align:center; background:#cfc;"
| 74 || June 22 || @ Athletics || 12–9 || Paulino (2–0) || Hahn (3–5) || Devenski (3) || 18,747 || 50–24 || W4
|- style="text-align:center; background:#fbb;"
| 75 || June 23 || @ Mariners || 3–13 || Hernández (3–2) || Musgrove (4–7) || Gallardo (1) || 31,783 || 50–25 || L1
|- style="text-align:center; background:#cfc;"
| 76 || June 24 || @ Mariners || 5–2 || McCullers (7–1) || Gaviglio (3–2) || — || 29,820 || 51–25 || W1 
|- style="text-align:center; background:#cfc;"
| 77 || June 25 || @ Mariners || 8–2 || Feliz (3–1) || Miranda (6–4) || — || 33,010 || 52–25 || W2
|- style="text-align:center; background:#fbb;"
| 78 || June 27 || Athletics || 4–6 || Manaea (7–4) || Fiers (5–3) || Casilla (14) || 28,312 || 52–26 || L1
|- style="text-align:center; background:#cfc;"
| 79 || June 28 || Athletics || 11–8 || Feliz (4–1) || Hahn (3–6) || Giles (18) || 34,075 || 53–26 || W1
|- style="text-align:center; background:#cfc;"
| 80 || June 29 || Athletics || 6–1 || Peacock (5–1) || Gossett (1–3) || — || 29,509 || 54–26 || W2
|-style="text-align:center; background:#fbb;"
| 81 || June 30 || Yankees || 4–13 || Pineda (8–4) || Feliz (4–2) || Mitchell (1) || 40,024 || 54–27 || L1 
|-

|-style="text-align:center; background:#cfc;"
| 82 || July 1 || Yankees ||  7–6 || Diaz (1–1) || Betances (3–3) || Giles (19) || 41,010 || 55–27 || W1
|-style="text-align:center; background:#cfc;"
| 83 || July 2 || Yankees || 8–1 || Devenski (5–3) || Severino (5–4) || — || 41,761 || 56–27 || W2 
|-style="text-align:center; background:#cfc;"
| 84 || July 4 || @ Braves || 16–4 || Peacock (6–1)  || Newcomb (1–3) || — ||  41,456 || 57–27 || W3
|- style="text-align:center; background:#cfc;"
| 85 || July 5 || @ Braves || 10–4 || Devenski (6–3) || García (2–7) || — || 37,278 || 58–27 || W4
|- style="text-align:center; background:#fbb;"
| 86 || July 6 || @ Blue Jays || 4–7 || Liriano (5–4) || McCullers (7–2) || Osuna (22) || 40,949  || 58–28 || L1 
|-style="text-align:center; background:#cfc;"
| 87 || July 7 || @ Blue Jays ||  12–2 || Morton (6–3) || Sanchez (0–2) || — || 37,332 || 59–28 || W1
|- style="text-align:center; background:#fbb;"
| 88 || July 8 || @ Blue Jays || 2–7 || Stroman (9–5) || Fiers (5–4) || — || 46,659 || 59–29 || L1 
|-style="text-align:center; background:#cfc;"
| 89 || July 9 || @ Blue Jays || 19–1 || Peacock (7–1) || Happ (3–6) || — || 46,622 || 60–29 || W1
|- style="text-align:center; background:#bbcaff;"
| colspan="10" | 88th All-Star Game in Miami, Florida
|-style="text-align:center; background:#cfc;"
| 90 || July 14 || Twins || 10–5 || Morton (7–3) || Berríos (8–3) || — || 38,006 || 61–29 || W2
|- style="text-align:center; background:#fbb;"
| 91 || July 15 || Twins || 2–4 || Santana (11–6) || Musgrove (4–8) || Kintzler (25) || 41,038 || 61–30 || L1 
|-style="text-align:center; background:#cfc;"
| 92 || July 16 || Twins || 5–2 || Fiers (6–4) || Gibson (5–8) || Giles (20) || 38,253 || 62–30 || W1
|-style="text-align:center; background:#fbb;"
| 93 || July 17 || Mariners || 7–9 (10) || Gallardo (4–7) || Sipp (0–1) || Díaz (17) || 24,701 || 62–31 || L1
|-style="text-align:center; background:#cfc;"
| 94 || July 18 || Mariners || 6–2 || Peacock (8–1) || Gaviglio (3–5) || Gregerson (1) || 27,111  || 63–31 || W1
|-style="text-align:center; background:#fbb;"
| 95 || July 19 || Mariners || 1–4 || Paxton (9–3) || Morton (7–4) || Díaz (18) || 35,191 || 63–32 || L1 
|-style="text-align:center; background:#cfc;"
| 96 || July 21 || @ Orioles || 8–7 || Fiers (7–4) || Jiménez (4–6) || Giles (21) || 25,784 || 64–32 || W1 
|-style="text-align:center; background:#cfc;"
| 97 || July 22 || @ Orioles || 8–4 ||  Martes (3–0) || O'Day (1–3) || — || 32,524 || 65–32 ||W2
|-style="text-align:center; background:#fbb;"
| 98 || July 23 || @ Orioles || 7–9 || Givens (7–0) || Gregerson (2–3) || Britton (6) || 21,533 || 65–33 || L1
|-style="text-align:center; background:#cfc;"
| 99 || July 24 || @ Phillies || 13–4 || Musgrove (5–8) || Velasquez (2–6) || — || 17,567 || 66–33 || W1
|-style="text-align:center; background:#cfc;"
| 100 || July 25 || @ Phillies || 5–0 || Morton (8–4) || Pivetta (3–6) || — || 17,176 || 67–33 || W2
|-style="text-align:center; background:#fbb;"
| 101 || July 26 || @ Phillies || 0–9 || Nola (8–6) || Fiers (7–5) || — || 19,718 || 67–34 || L1 
|-style="text-align:center; background:#cfc;"
| 102 || July 28 || @ Tigers || 6–5 || Peacock (9–1) || Rondón (1–2) || Giles (22) || 30,358 || 68–34 || W1 
|-style="text-align:center; background:#fbb;"
| 103 || July 29 || @ Tigers || 3–5 || Boyd (5–5) || Martes (3–1) || J. Wilson (13) || 33,766 || 68–35 || L1
|-style="text-align:center; background:#fbb;"
| 104 || July 30 || @ Tigers || 1–13 || Verlander (6–7) || McCullers (7–3) || — || 31,970  || 68–36 || L2 
|-style="text-align:center; background:#cfc;"
| 105 || July 31 || Rays || 14–7 || Morton (9–4) || Cobb (9–7) || — || 24,154 || 69–36 || W1
|-

|-style="text-align:center; background:#fbb;"
| 106 || August 1 || Rays || 4–6 || Archer (8–6) || Fiers (7–6) || Colomé (31) || 22,985 || 69–37 || L1 
|-style="text-align:center; background:#fbb;"
| 107 || August 2 || Rays || 0–3 || Pruitt (6–2) || Keuchel (9–1) || Colomé (32) || 26,722 || 69–38 || L2 
|-style="text-align:center; background:#fbb;"
| 108 || August 3 || Rays || 3–5 || Boxberger (3–3) || Liriano (6–6) || Colomé (33) || 23,404 || 69–39 || L3 
|-style="text-align:center; background:#cfc;"
| 109 || August 4 || Blue Jays || 16–7 || Peacock (10–1) || Valdez (1–1) || — || 39,287 || 70–39 || W1
|-style="text-align:center; background:#fbb;"
| 110 || August 5 || Blue Jays || 5–6 (10) || Tepera (6–1) || Liriano (6–7) || Osuna (28) || 41,950 || 70–40 || L1 
|-style="text-align:center; background:#cfc;"
| 111 || August 6 || Blue Jays || 7–6 || Martes (4–1) || Osuna (3–3) || — || 36,300 || 71–40 || W1
|-style="text-align:center; background:#fbb;"
| 112 || August 8 || @ White Sox || 5–8 || Holland (6–11) || Keuchel (9–2) || Clippard (2) || 13,974 || 71–41 || L1
|-style="text-align:center; background:#fbb;"
| 113 || August 9 || @ White Sox || 1–7 || González (6–10) || McHugh (0–1) || — || 14,824 || 71–42 || L2 
|-style="text-align:center; background:#fbb;"
| 114 || August 10 || @ White Sox || 2–3 (11) || Holmberg (2–3) || Martes (4–2) || — || 18,034 || 71–43 || L3 
|-style="text-align:center; background:#fbb;"
| 115 || August 11 || @ Rangers || 4–6 || Hamels (7–1) || Morton (9–5) || — || 33,897 || 71–44 || L4 
|-style="text-align:center; background:#fbb;"
| 116 || August 12 || @ Rangers || 3–8 || Ross (3–2) || Fiers (7–7) || — || 47,306 || 71–45 || L5 
|-style="text-align:center; background:#cfc;"
| 117 || August 13 || @ Rangers || 2–1 || Keuchel (10–2) || Cashner (7–9) || Giles (26) || 31,517 || 72–45 || W1
|-style="text-align:center; background:#fbb;"
| 118 || August 14 || @ D-backs || 0–2 || Greinke (14–5) || McHugh (0–2) || Rodney (27) || 20,405 || 72–46 || L1 
|-style="text-align:center; background:#cfc;"
| 119 || August 15 || @ D-backs || 9–4 || Martes (5–2) || Banda (1–3) || — || 16,935 || 73–46 || W1 
|-style="text-align:center; background:#cfc;"
| 120 || August 16 || D-backs || 9–5 || Morton (10–5) || Walker (6–7) || — || 27,278 || 74–46 || W2 
|-style="text-align:center; background:#fbb;"
| 121 || August 17 || D-backs || 0–4 || Corbin (10–11) || Fiers (7–8) || — || 27,949 || 74–47 || L1
|-style="text-align:center; background:#cfc;"
| 122 || August 18 || Athletics || 3–1 || Keuchel (11–2) || Manaea (8–8) || Giles (24) || 30,908 || 75–47 || W1 
|-style="text-align:center; background:#cfc;"
| 123 || August 19 || Athletics || 3–0 || McHugh (1–2) || Graveman (3–4) || Clippard (4) || 32,796 || 76–47 || W2
|-style="text-align:center; background:#fbb;"
| 124 || August 20 || Athletics || 2–3 || Cotton (6–10) || Peacock (10–2) || Treinen (7) || 34,011 || 76–48 || L1
|-style="text-align:center; background:#fbb;"
| 125 || August 22 || Nationals || 3–4 || Roark (10–8) || Morton (10–6) || Doolittle (15) || 23,798 || 76–49 || L2 
|-style="text-align:center; background:#cfc;"
| 126 || August 23 || Nationals ||  6–1 || Fiers (8–8) || Jackson (4–3) || — || 23,434 || 77–49 || W1 
|-style="text-align:center; background:#fbb;"
| 127 || August 24 || Nationals ||  4–5 (11) || Albers (7–2) || Clippard (2–7) || Solis (1) || 24,761 || 77–50 || L1
|-style="text-align:center; background:#cfc;"
| 128 || August 25 || @ Angels || 2–1 || McHugh (2–2) || Bridwell (7–2) || Giles (25) || 42,333 || 78–50 || W1
|-style="text-align:center; background:#fbb;"
| 129 || August 26 || @ Angels || 6–7 || Wood (2–4) || Clippard (2–8) || Parker (2) || 41,101 || 78–51 || L1
|-style="text-align:center; background:#cfc;"
| 130 || August 27 || @ Angels || 7–5 || Musgrove (6–8) || Bedrosian (3–3) || Giles (26) || 37,606 || 79–51 || W1
|-style="text-align:center; background:#fbb;"
| 131 || August 29 || Rangers || 2–12 || Pérez (10–10)  || Fiers (8–9)  || — || 3,485 || 79–52 || L1 
|-style="text-align:center; background:#fbb;"
| 132 || August 30 || Rangers || 1–8 || Cashner (8–9) || Keuchel (11–3) || — || 6,123 || 79–53 || L2 
|-style="text-align:center; background:#cfc;"
| 133 || August 31 || Rangers || 5–1 || Devenski (7–3) || Martinez (3–6) || Giles (27) || 3,385 || 80–53 || W1
|-

|-style="text-align:center; background:#cfc;"
| 134 || September 2 (1) || Mets || 12–8 || Morton (11–6) || Harvey (4–4) || — || 30,319 || 81–53 || W2
|-style="text-align:center; background:#cfc;"
| 135 || September 2 (2) || Mets || 4–1 || Musgrove (7–8) || Lugo (5–4) || Giles (28) || 34,904 || 82–53 || W3 
|-style="text-align:center; background:#cfc;"
| 136 || September 3 || Mets || 8–6 || Harris (3–2) || Flexen (3–4) || Devenski (4) || 32,065 || 83–53 || W4 
|-style="text-align:center; background:#cfc;"
| 137 || September 4 || @ Mariners || 6–2 || Keuchel (12–3) || Rzepczynski (2–1) || — || 20,108 || 84–53 || W5 
|-style="text-align:center; background:#cfc;"
| 138 || September 5 || @ Mariners || 3–1 || Verlander (11–8) || Pazos (4–5) || Giles (29) || 14,568 || 85–53 || W6
|-style="text-align:center; background:#cfc;"
| 139 || September 6 || @ Mariners || 5–3 || Devenski (8–3) || Díaz (3–6) || — || 15,104 || 86–53 || W7 
|-style="text-align:center; background:#fbb;"
| 140 || September 8 || @ Athletics || 8–9 || Treinen (2–6) || Giles (1–3) || — || 12,288 || 86–54 || L1
|-style="text-align:center; background:#fbb;"
| 141 || September 9 (1) || @ Athletics || 1–11 || Gossett (4–8) || Morton (11–7) || — ||  || 86–55 || L2 
|-style="text-align:center; background:#fbb;"
| 142 || September 9 (2) || @ Athletics || 4–11 || Hatcher (1–2) || Devenski (8–4) || — || 19,244 || 86–56 || L3 
|-style="text-align:center; background:#fbb;"
| 143 || September 10 || @ Athletics || 2–10 || Graveman (5–4) || Keuchel (12–4) || — || 15,892 || 86–57 || L4
|-style="text-align:center; background:#cfc;"
| 144 || September 12 || @ Angels || 1–0 || Verlander (12–8) || Richards (0–1) || Giles (30) || 36,088 || 87–57 || W1 
|-style="text-align:center; background:#fbb;"
| 145 || September 13 || @ Angels || 1–9 || Skaggs (2–5) || Fiers (8–10) || — || 33,899 || 87–58 || L1
|-style="text-align:center; background:#cfc;"
| 146 || September 14 || @ Angels || 5–2 || Peacock (11–2) || Nolasco (6–14) || — || 35,715 || 88–58 || W1 
|-style="text-align:center; background:#cfc;"
| 147 || September 15 || Mariners || 5–2 || Morton (12–7) || Paxton (12–4) || Giles (31) || 28,328 || 89–58 || W2
|-style="text-align:center; background:#cfc;"
| 148 || September 16 || Mariners || 8–6 || Keuchel (13–4) || Ramírez (5–6) || Musgrove (1) || 33,650 || 90–58 || W3 
|-style="text-align:center; background:#cfc;"
| 149 || September 17 || Mariners || 7–1 || Verlander (13–8) || Moore (1–4) || — || 30,247 || 91–58 || W4
|-style="text-align:center; background:#cfc;"
| 150 || September 19 || White Sox || 3–1 || McHugh (3–2) || Giolito (2–3) || Giles (32) || 23,293 || 92–58 || W5 
|-style="text-align:center; background:#cfc;"
| 151 || September 20 || White Sox || 4–3 || Peacock (12–2) || Shields  (4–7) || Musgrove (2) || 24,995 || 93–58 || W6 
|-style="text-align:center; background:#fbb;"
| 152 || September 21 || White Sox || 1–3 || Volstad (1–0) || Keuchel (13–5) || Minaya (5) || 24,283 || 93–59 || L1 
|-style="text-align:center; background:#cfc;"
| 153 || September 22 || Angels || 3–0 || Verlander (14–8) || Petit (5–2) || Giles (33) || 34,127 || 94–59 || W1
|-style="text-align:center; background:#cfc;"
| 154 || September 23 || Angels || 6–2 || Morton (13–7) || Norris (2–6) || — || 34,035 || 95–59 || W2
|-style="text-align:center; background:#fbb;"
| 155 || September 24 || Angels || 5–7 || Middleton (6–1) || Devenski (8–5) || Parker (7) || 36,756 || 95–60 || L1
|-style="text-align:center; background:#cfc;"
| 156 || September 25 || @ Rangers || 11–2 || McHugh (4–2) || Cashner (10–11) || — || 30,390 || 96–60 || W1 
|-style="text-align:center; background:#cfc;"
| 157 || September 26 || @ Rangers || 14–3 || Keuchel (14–5) || Hamels (11–5) || — || 28,976 || 97–60 || W2
|-style="text-align:center; background:#cfc;"
| 158 || September 27 || @ Rangers || 12–2 || Verlander (15–8) || Martinez (3–8) || — || 26,053 || 98–60 || W3
|-style="text-align:center; background:#cfc;"
| 159 || September 28 || @ Red Sox || 12–2 || Peacock (13–2) || Rodriguez (6–7) || — || 34,222 || 99–60 || W4 
|-style="text-align:center; background:#cfc;"
| 160 || September 29 || @ Red Sox || 3–2 || Morton (14–7) || Fister (5–9) || Giles (34) || 36,623 || 100–60 || W5
|-style="text-align:center; background:#fbb;"
| 161 || September 30 || @ Red Sox || 3–6 || Pomeranz (17–6) || McCullers (7–4) || — || 35,722 || 100–61 || L1 
|-

|-style="text-align:center; background:#cfc;"
| 162 || October 1 || @ Red Sox || 4–3 || McHugh (5–2) || Abad (2–1) || Clippard (5) || 34,517 || 101–61 || W1 
|-

|-
| Legend:       = Win       = Loss       = PostponementBold = Astros team member

Postseason

|- style="text-align:center; background:#cfc;"
| 1 || October 5 || Red Sox || 8–2 || Verlander (1–0)  || Sale (0–1) || — || 43,102 || 1–0
|- style="text-align:center; background:#cfc;"
| 2 || October 6 || Red Sox || 8–2 || Keuchel (1–0) || Pomeranz (0–1) || — || 43,410 || 2–0
|- style="text-align:center; background:#fcc;"
| 3 || October 8 || @ Red Sox || 3–10 || Kelly (1–0) || Liriano (0–1) || — || 38,010 || 2–1
|- style="text-align:center; background:#cfc;"
| 4 || October 9 || @ Red Sox || 5–4 || Verlander (2–0) || Sale (0–2) || Giles (1)  || 37,305 || 3–1
|-

|- style="text-align:center; background:#cfc;"
| 1 || October 13 || Yankees || 2–1 || Keuchel (1–0) || Tanaka (0–1) || Giles (1) || 43,116 || 1–0
|- style="text-align:center; background:#cfc;"
| 2 || October 14 || Yankees || 2–1 || Verlander (1–0) || Chapman (0–1) || — || 43,193 || 2–0
|- style="text-align:center; background:#fcc;"
| 3 || October 16 || @ Yankees || 1–8 || Sabathia  (1–0) || Morton (0–1) || — || 49,373 || 2–1
|- style="text-align:center; background: #fcc;"
| 4 || October 17 || @ Yankees || 4–6 || Green (1–0) || Giles (0–1) || Chapman (1) || 48,804 || 2–2
|- style="text-align:center; background:#fcc;"
| 5 || October 18 || @ Yankees || 0–5 || Tanaka (1–1) || Keuchel (1–1) || — || 49,647 || 2–3
|- style="text-align:center; background:#cfc;"
| 6 || October 20 || Yankees || 7–1 || Verlander (2–0) || Severino (0–1) || — || 43,179 || 3–3
|- style="text-align:center; background:#cfc"
| 7 || October 21 || Yankees || 4–0 || Morton (1–1) || Sabathia (1–1) || McCullers (1) || 43,201 || 4–3
|-

|- style="text-align:center; background:#fcc"
| 1 || October 24 || @ Dodgers || 1–3 || Kershaw (1–0) || Keuchel (0–1) || Jansen (1) || 54,253 || 0–1
|- style="text-align:center; background:#cfc"
| 2 || October 25 || @ Dodgers || 7–6 (11) || Devenski (1–0) || McCarthy (0–1) || — || 54,293 || 1–1
|- style="text-align:center; background:#cfc"
| 3 || October 27 || Dodgers || 5–3 || McCullers (1–0) || Darvish (0–1) || Peacock (1) || 43,282 || 2–1
|- style="text-align:center; background:#fcc"
| 4 || October 28 || Dodgers || 2–6 || Watson (1–0) || Giles (0–1) || — || 43,322 || 2–2
|- style="text-align:center; background:#cfc"
| 5 || October 29 || Dodgers || 13–12 (10) || Musgrove (1–0) || Jansen (0–1)|| — || 43,300 || 3–2
|- style="text-align:center; background:#fcc"
| 6 || October 31 || @ Dodgers || 1–3 || Watson (2–0) || Verlander (0–1) || Jansen (2) || 54,128 || 3–3
|- style="text-align:center; background:#cfc"
| 7 || November 1 || @ Dodgers || 5–1 || Morton (1–0) || Darvish (0–2) || — || 54,124 || 4–3
|-

Roster

Statistics

Batting 

Players in bold are on the active MLB roster as of the 2022 season.
 
Note: G = Games played; AB = At bats; R = Runs; H = Hits; 2B = Doubles; 3B = Triples; HR = Home runs; RBI = Runs batted in; SB = Stolen bases; BB = Walks; K = Strikeouts; AVG = Batting average; OBP = On-base percentage; SLG = Slugging percentage; TB = Total bases

Pitching 

Players in bold are on the active MLB roster as of the 2022 season.

Note: W = Wins; L = Losses; ERA = Earned run average; G = Games pitched; GS = Games started; SV = Saves; IP = Innings pitched; H = Hits allowed; R = Runs allowed; ER = Earned runs allowed; BB = Walks allowed; K = Strikeouts

Awards and league leaders

Awards

League leaders

Farm system

Illegal electronic sign stealing and punishment

Two years later in November 2019, allegations were made that the Astros used a sophisticated electronic sign stealing system. The Athletic published a report which stated that Mike Fiers, who left the Astros after 2017 and later played for the Detroit Tigers and Oakland Athletics, warned his new teams about the practice. An MLB investigation into the allegations was launched following the report.

Emails reveal that Astros management asked their employees who were scouting upcoming opponents: “One thing in specific we are looking for is picking up signs coming out of the dugout,  .  .  .  if we need cameras/binoculars, etc  .  .  .  ”  The Athletic stated that MLB rules allow binoculars (but not to relay signs the same game), but do not seem to allow cameras.

On January 13, 2020, Major League Baseball handed down punishments for the Astros ballclub in reference to the sign stealing allegations. Both general manager Jeff Luhnow and manager A. J. Hinch were suspended for the entirety of the 2020 season, and the club was fined $5 million and forced to forfeit first and second round draft picks of the 2020 and 2021 drafts. This punishment is a record for such an infringement.  The $5 million fine is the highest allowed by the MLB Constitution. As a consequence of MLB's announcement, Luhnow and Hinch were promptly fired by Astros' owner Jim Crane the same day.

See also

 List of Major League Baseball 100 win seasons
 List of Major League Baseball batting champions
 List of Major League Baseball franchise postseason streaks
 List of Silver Slugger Award winners at second base
 List of Silver Slugger Award winners at outfield

References

External links
2017 Houston Astros season official site 
2017 Houston Astros season at Baseball Reference

Houston Astros seasons
Houston Astros
Houston Astros
American League West champion seasons
American League champion seasons
World Series champion seasons